The Battle of Matapan took place on 19 July 1717 off the Cape Matapan, on the coast of the Mani Peninsula, now in southern Greece. The naval battle was between the Armada Grossa of the Republic of Venice, supported by a mixed squadron of allied ships from Portugal, the Papal States and Malta, and the Ottoman fleet, under Kapudan Pasha Eğribozlu İbrahim Pasha.

Prelude 
The 24 Venetian sailing ships under Marcantonio Diedo, commander of the Venetian fleet, met up with another Venetian squadron of 24 galleys under the Capitano generale da Mar Andrea Pisani and a small squadron of 9 mixed Portuguese-Maltese ships under the Maltese knight Bellefontaine near Cape Matapan on 2 July. After trying separately to win the wind gauge, and running out of water supply, the Allied force went to Marathonisi, near the top of the Gulf of Matapan, to resupply. They had tried to reach Sapientza, but winds were against them and they took the risk of being caught in the gulf.

The battle 

The Ottoman fleet, with 30 sailing ships, and 4 galleys, was seen to the south, on the west side of the bay entrance, on 19 July. With a light wind from the SSE, this meant that they had the advantage. Diedo, unable to sail to the west of the Ottoman fleet, decided to sail slowly east, across the bay.

The Allied fleet was organized into four divisions: the Capitano delle Navi, Diedo, was in the Van, followed by the Center, led by his second in command, Correr. The 3rd or Rear Division was commanded by Dolfin. The 4th or Allied Division was commanded by Belle Fontaine.

Ibrahim with 6 ships attacked the Rear Division at about 6am, while the rest of his fleet went ahead and attacked the Van and Center. At about 12pm the fleets were approaching the east side of the bay, and shortly after the leading ships turned, the wind turned from the SE, putting the leading Venetian ships to windward of some of the Ottoman fleet for the first time. Taking advantage of this, Diedo attacked them and the tough battle continued. At about 3pm the Ottoman fleet retired, sailing for the Cervi-Cerigo passage, while the Allies sailed for Cape Matapan. Neither side wished to continue the fight.

Aftermath 
As a result of the battle, the Venetian attempt to recapture the Morea was foiled and the Ottoman reconquest of the peninsula was confirmed.

Each Allied state gave their own ships complete credit for any achievements. Some of these accounts are almost totally unreliable due to a variety of reasons—for example, their inclusion of forces which were not actually present for the battle.

Ships involved

Venice and allies 

Blue Division - Vanguard
Madonna dell'Arsenal (Madonna of the Arsenal) 68 guns
Costanza 70 guns
Trionfo (Triumph) 70 guns (flagship of Admiral Diedo)
Leon Trionfante 80 guns
San Francesco da Paola 54 guns
Aquila Valiera (Valieran Eagle) 70 guns
Fenice (Phoenyx) 60 guns
Sant'Andrea 60 guns
Gloria Veneta (Venetian Glory) 68 guns
Yellow Division - Center
Corona (Crown) 74 guns
Madonna della Salute (Madonna of Health) 70 guns (flagship of Almirante Ludovico Diedo)
Terror 70 guns
San Pio V (Saint Pius V) 70 guns
San Pietro Apostolo, bought in Livorno, 50 guns
Aquila Volante (Flying Eagle) 52 guns, also reported as AquilettaFede Guerriera (Warrior Faith) 60 guns
Nettuno (Neptune) 52 guns
Sacra Lega (Holy League) 50 guns
Red Division - Rear
San Gaetano 70 guns
Fortuna Guerriera (Warrior Fortune) 68 guns
Venezia Trionfante (Triumphant Venice) 52 guns
San Lorenzo Zustinian II 70 guns
Grand'Alessandro (Big Alexander) 70 guns (flagship of Almirante Dolfin)
Colomba d'Oro (Golden Dove) 70 guns, also reported as ColombaRosa (Rose) 60 guns, also reported as Rosa MocenigaValor Coronato (Crowned valour) 52 gunsSão Lourenço 58 guns (Portuguese)
Allied DivisionSan Raimondo 46 guns (Maltese)Fortuna Guerriera 70 guns (Venetian)Rainha dos Anjos 56 guns (Portuguese)Nossa Senhora das Necessidades 66 guns (Portuguese)Santa Catarina 56 guns (Chevalier de Bellefontaine - Maltese)Nossa Senhora do Pilar 84 guns (Portuguese)Santa Rosa 66 guns (Portuguese)Nossa Senhora da Conceição 80 guns (General-Admiral Lopo Furtado de Mendoça - Portuguese)Nossa Senhora da Assunção 66 guns (Portuguese)
AuxiliariesCaptain Trivisan (fireship) - ScuttledMadonna del Rosario (hospital ship) - Sunk

Galleys
13 Venetian
5 Maltese
4 Papal
2 Tuscan

Ottomans
Ships of the LineKebir Üç Ambarlı (The Great Three Decker) 114 (Flagship of Ibrahim Pasha)Ejder Başlı (The Dragon) 70Çifte Ceylan Kıçlı (The Two Gazelles) 70Yaldızlı Hurma (The Gilded Date) 70Şadırvan Kıçlı (The Sprinkling Fountain) 66Siyah At Başlı (The Black Horse) 66Beyaz At Başlı (The White Horse) 66Kula At Başlı (The Grey Horse) 66Büyük Gül Başlı (The Great Rose) 66Yılan Başlı (The Snake) 34 (unique ship with 2x372 pdr "üç kantar" monster guns firing marble balls)Ifrit Başlı (The Demon) 62Küçük Gül Başlı (The Little Rose) 60Çifte Teber Kıçlı (Two Halberds) 58Yıldız Bagçeli (The Star Garden) 58Zülfikâr Kıçlı (The Two Pointed Sword) 56Akçaşehir (Town of Akçaşehir) 56 gunsServi Bagçeli (The Cypress Garden) 54Ay Bagçeli (The Moon Garden) 54Yeşil Kuşaklı (Green Belted) 54Sarı Kuşaklı (Yellow Belted) 54Kırmızı Kuşaklı (Red Belted) 52Al At Başlı (The Red Horse) 52Yaldızlı Nar Kıçlı (The Gilded Pomegranate) 52

CaravellasMavi Arslan Başlı (The Blue Lion) 44Siyah Arslan Başlı (The Black Lion) 44Taç Başlı (The Crown) 44Güneş Kıçlı (The Sun) 44Kuş Bagçeli Karavele (The Bird Garden Caravella) 44Yıldız Kıçlı (The Star) 40Mavi Kıçlı Karavele'' (The Blue Caravella) 38

References

Sources
 História da Marinha de Portugal, Editora das Forças Armadas
 
 
 

Matapan
Matapan 1717
Matapan 1717
Matapan 1717
History of the papacy
Matapan
1717 in Europe
18th century in Greece
1717 in the Ottoman Empire